Chiugiana-La Commenda is a  of the  of Corciano in the Province of Perugia, Umbria, central Italy. At the time of the Istat census of 2001 it had 6427 inhabitants.

References 

Frazioni of Corciano